The International Carnivorous Plant Society (ICPS) is a non-profit organization founded in 1972. It is the International Cultivar Registration Authority for carnivorous plants. As of June 2011, the society had around 1400 members.

The ICPS is probably best known for its quarterly publication, the Carnivorous Plant Newsletter. 

Conservation efforts
The ICPS has set up the Nepenthes clipeata Survival Project (NcSP) to facilitate ex situ conservation of this species. With only an estimated 15 plants remaining in the wild as of 1995, Nepenthes clipeata is the most endangered of all known tropical pitcher plants. It is estimated that there are only three or four genetically-distinct lines of "white market" (legally collected) plants in cultivation.

The ICPS partially funded the establishment of The Rare Nepenthes Collection, which aims to conserve four of the rarest Nepenthes species: N. aristolochioides, N. clipeata, N. khasiana, and N. rigidifolia.

See also
 North American Sarracenia Conservancy

References

Further reading

 Schlauer, J. 1998. The correct naming of carnivorous plants: ICBN, ICNCP, and the roles of CPN and ICPS. Carnivorous Plant Newsletter 27(1): 27–28.
 Meyers-Rice, B. 2001.  Carnivorous Plant Newsletter 30(2): 43–50.
 Brittnacher, J. 2002.  Carnivorous Plant Newsletter 31(3): 77.
 Brittnacher, J. 2002.  Carnivorous Plant Newsletter 31(4): 109.
 Rice, B. 2003.  Carnivorous Plant Newsletter 32(1): 12–13.
 Rice, B. & J. Brittnacher 2003.  Carnivorous Plant Newsletter 32(1): 29.
 Rice, B. 2005.  Carnivorous Plant Newsletter 34(4): 111–114.

External links
Official website

Carnivorous plant societies
International scientific organizations
Environmental organizations established in 1972
Scientific organizations established in 1972
Charities based in California
Organizations based in Contra Costa County, California